Tukaram Omble AC ( 1954 – 27 November 2008) was an Indian police officer and a former member of Indian army who served as an assistant sub-inspector (ASI) of the Mumbai Police. He was killed in action during the 2008 Mumbai attacks, at Girgaum Chowpatty in Mumbai. The Indian government posthumously honoured Omble on 26 January 2009 with the Ashoka Chakra, the country's highest peacetime military award.

Biography 

Omble joined the Mumbai police as a constable in 1991 after retiring from the Indian Army's Signal Corps as a naik. He was an ASI in the Mumbai Police. On 26 November he and his team were guarding a checkpoint when they were approached by two pakistani terrorist in a hijacked vehicle. After an initial shootout, one of the terrorists died inside the vehicle. The other terrorist, Ajmal Kasab, exited the vehicle and feigned surrender. As an unarmed Omble approached him, Kasab got up and opened fire. Omble stood in front of him and held on to the barrel of Kasab's rifle, which prevented the bullets from injuring anyone else apart from Omble, who died due to this action. Kasab was subsequently apprehended by the rest of Omble's team. 

The Government of India later awarded Omble with the Ashoka Chakra in recognition of his actions in helping to apprehend Kasab.

Awards and honours
 The Ashoka Chakra.
 CNN Indian of the Year award under the category of 'Extraordinary Service to the Nation'.

A jumping spider species from the Maharashtra region was named after him in June 2021.

See also
 Hemant Karkare
 Sandeep Unnikrishnan
 Vijay Salaskar
 Ashok Kamte
 Havaldar Gajender Singh
 Sadanand Date

References

External links 
 

2008 deaths
Deaths by firearm in India
Terrorism victims in India
Police officers from Mumbai
Indian police officers killed in the line of duty
Victims of the 2008 Mumbai attacks
Recipients of the Ashoka Chakra (military decoration)
Marathi people
Year of birth missing
Ashoka Chakra